The Kansas Insurance Commissioner (KIC), in full the Kansas State Insurance Commissioner, has the primary responsibility to the people whose personal lives are protected by insurance in the state of Kansas. It is an elected position and is currently held by Republican Vicki Schmidt.

The Kansas Insurance Department was established by the Kansas Legislature in 1871. It has four major regulatory functions:
 Regulate and Review Companies: Sixty-five companies are headquartered in Kansas, plus 1,592 other companies sell policies in Kansas. The Kansas Insurance Department, under the direction of the Commissioner, regulates and reviews these companies to make sure they are solvent and comply with insurance laws and regulations;
 Educate Consumers: To educate consumers about insurance, the Kansas Insurance Department publishes brochures and rate guides on every type of insurance coverage; provides speakers on numerous insurance topics; and prepares vital public service information to mass media
 Assist Consumers: The Kansas Insurance Department helps consumers when they have disputes with insurance companies. Such assistance has resulted in millions of dollars in refunds and claims payments for consumers; and
 License Agents; Approximately 22,000 resident agents and 68,000 nonresident agents are licensed in Kansas to sell insurance products. The Kansas Insurance Department also requires agents to meet ongoing continuing education requirements.

Office holders
The office was known as the Superintendent of Insurance until 1927, when the title changed to Commissioner of Insurance. Since the office's inception, it has primarily been held by the Republican Party, with only 3 office holders not being members of the Republican party. All but 14 years of the office's existence has been with a Republican.

Kansas State Superintendents of Insurance

Kansas State Commissioners of Insurance

References

External links
 
 Kansas Insurance Department publications at Kansas Government Information (KGI) Online Library

1871 establishments in Kansas
Insurance in the United States